Mironescu is a Romanian surname. Notable people with the surname include:

Alexandru Mironescu (1903–1973), Romanian prose writer
Gheorghe Mironescu (1874–1949), Romanian politician
I. I. Mironescu (1883–1939), Romanian prose writer and physician

Romanian-language surnames